The year 599 BC was a year of the pre-Julian Roman calendar. In the Roman Empire, it was known as year 155 Ab urbe condita. The denomination 599 BC for this year has been used since the early medieval period, when the Anno Domini calendar era became the prevalent method in Europe for naming years.

Births
Mahavira, last Tirthankara of Jainism

Deaths
Duke Hui of Qi, ruler of the Chinese state of Qi

References